Mülk was a type of land unit under the Ottomans.

Characteristics of mülk
Mülk was similar to freehold land; owners could buy, sell, and mortgage freely. It was exempt from some kinds of land taxes. Mülk was about more than just the land; it might also include the right to annual malikane payments from tenants and farmers.

Context
In much of the near east, mülk can be contrasted against miri, which was effectively state-controlled land (perhaps a former mülk forfeited to the state when the owner had no heir to pass it on to). 

In some ways, mülk was similar to waqf property.

Related concepts
 çiftlik
 Iltizam
 Tapu resmi
 Sinirname
 Malikane
 Miri
 mawat: Dead land, or wilderness.

References

Land management in the Ottoman Empire
Property law